
Gmina Zbójna is a rural gmina (administrative district) in Łomża County, Podlaskie Voivodeship, in north-eastern Poland.

Villages
Gmina Zbójna contains the villages and settlements of Bienduszka, Dębniki, Dobry Las, Dobry Las-Leśniczówka, Gawrychy, Gontarze, Jagłowiec, Jurki, Kuzie, Laski, Nowogród, Osowiec, Osowiec-Leśniczówka, Pianki, Piasutno Żelazne, Piasutno Żelazne-Leśniczówka, Popiołki, Poredy, Poredy-Leśniczówka, Ruda Osowiecka, Siwiki, Sosnowy, Stanisławowo, Tabory-Rzym, Wyk and Zbójna.

Neighbouring gminas
Gmina Zbójna is bordered by the gminas of Kadzidło, Kolno, Lelis, Łyse, Mały Płock, Miastkowo, Nowogród and Turośl.

References

Polish official population figures 2006

Zbojna
Łomża County